RiverCities Transit is a public transit system serving the cities of Longview and Kelso in Cowlitz County, Washington.

History

Public transportation service in Cowlitz County began in 1975, with the purchase of a private bus company by the cities of Longview and Kelso. The two cities partnered with the Cowlitz County government to organize a public transportation benefit area in 1987, and a 0.1 percent sales tax to fund the bus system was approved by 77.3 percent of voters on September 16, 1987. The existing service, then named the "Community Urban Bus Service" (CUBS), was transferred to the Cowlitz Transit Authority on January 1, 1988.

In 2008, CUBS put a 0.2 percent sales tax increase up for public vote, seeking $2 million in additional annual revenue to continue running service and expanding frequency and hours of operation. The increase was approved by voters, bringing the total sales tax to 0.3 percent.

The Cowlitz Transit Authority adopted a 10-year "Transit Enhancement Plan" in 2010, proposing a re-branded system with more frequent service and newer buses. In 2011, CUBS began exploring a re-brand, complete with a new name, using an online poll. "RiverCities Transit" was announced as the winner later that month, and a new blue-and-gray color scheme was adopted for the system's bus fleet the following year. A new route system, focusing on corridors where buses run every 30 to 60 minutes, debuted in August 2013; an express route between Longview and Kelso debuted earlier that year in April, reducing travel times.

Services

Bus routes

Fleet

References

External links

Bus transportation in Washington (state)
Transit agencies in Washington (state)
Transportation in Cowlitz County, Washington